Rašić is a common Serbian and Croatian surname. It may refer to:

Aleksandar Rašić (b. 1984), Serbian basketball player
Branko Rašić (b. 1976), Serbian footballer
Damir Rašić (b. 1988), Croatian footballer
Danijel Rašić (b. 1988), Croatian footballer
Federico Rasic (b. 1992), Argentine footballer of Croatian-Serbian descent
Nikola "Kole" Rašić (1839–1898), Serbian revolutionary
Mario Rašić (b. 1989), Croatian footballer
Milan Rašić (b. 1985), Serbian volleyball player
Milena Rašić (b. 1990), Serbian volleyball player
Rale Rašić (b. 1935), Serbian-Australian footballer

Serbian surnames
Croatian surnames